Barrie was a provincial electoral district in central Ontario, Canada. It was created for the 2007 provincial election. The entire riding was created from Barrie—Simcoe—Bradford.

The riding includes all of the City of Barrie.

In 2018, the district was dissolved into Barrie—Innisfil and Barrie—Springwater—Oro-Medonte.

Members

Election results

2007 electoral reform referendum

Sources

Elections Ontario Past Election Results

Riding associations
Barrie Green Party
Barrie Liberal Riding Associations
Barrie NDP Riding Association
Barrie Provincial Progressive Conservative Association

Former provincial electoral districts of Ontario
Politics of Barrie